Alexandra of Edinburgh  (Alexandra Louise Olga Victoria; 1 September 1878 – 16 April 1942) was the fourth child and third daughter of Alfred, Duke of Saxe-Coburg and Gotha, and Grand Duchess Maria Alexandrovna of Russia. As the wife of Ernst II, she was Princess consort of Hohenlohe-Langenburg. She was a granddaughter of both Queen Victoria of the United Kingdom and Tsar Alexander II of Russia.

Early life
Alexandra was born Princess Alexandra of Edinburgh on 1 September 1878 at Rosenau Castle, Coburg. Her father was Prince Alfred, Duke of Edinburgh, the second-eldest son of Queen Victoria of the United Kingdom and Prince Albert of Saxe-Coburg and Gotha. Her mother was Grand Duchess Maria Alexandrovna of Russia, the only surviving daughter of Alexander II of Russia and Marie of Hesse and by Rhine. She was baptised Alexandra Louise Olga Victoria on 2 October 1878 at Edinburgh Palace, Coburg, presumably by her mother's chaplain. Her godparents included her maternal uncle Grand Duke Alexei Alexandrovich of Russia.

During Alexandra's formative years, her father, occupied with his career in the Navy and later as a ruler in Coburg, paid little attention to his family. It was Alexandra's mother who was the domineering presence in their children's life. Alexandra had four siblings: Alfred, Marie, Victoria Melita, and Beatrice (her only younger sibling). Throughout her life, Alexandra was usually overshadowed by her elder sisters; she was considered less beautiful and more subdued than Marie and Victoria Melita.

Nicknamed 'Sandra' by her family, Alexandra spent her childhood first in England, then from  1886 to 1889 in Malta, where her father was serving with the British Navy. In 1889 the family moved to Coburg, Germany, as her father was the heir apparent to the duchy of Saxe-Coburg and Gotha. She was a bridesmaid at the 1885 wedding of her aunt Princess Beatrice of the United Kingdom to Prince Henry of Battenberg, and at the wedding of the Duke and Duchess of York in 1893. That year, her great-uncle, The Duke of Saxe-Coburg and Gotha (brother of her paternal grandfather, Prince Albert of Saxe-Coburg and Gotha) died without issue. As Prince Albert had passed away, and her uncle The Prince of Wales had renounced his claim to the duchy, the ducal throne fell to the Duke of Edinburgh. Following her father's succession, though Alexandra remained a British princess, she took the title of Princess Alexandra of Saxe-Coburg and Gotha.

Marriage
 
Alexandra's mother, Grand Duchess Maria Alexandrovna, believed in marrying her daughters young, before they began to think for themselves. At the end of 1895, she arranged Alexandra's engagement to Ernst, Hereditary Prince of Hohenlohe-Langenburg (13 September 1863 – 11 December 1950). Alexandra's grandmother, Queen Victoria, complained that she was too young. Alexandra's father objected to the status of his future son-in-law, who would become the 7th Prince of Hohenlohe-Langenburg. The House of Hohenlohe-Langenburg was mediatized — a formerly ruling family who had ceded their sovereign rights to others while (in theory) retaining their equal birth; it was not considered a brilliant match. The couple were also related: Ernst was a grandson of Princess Feodora of Leiningen, Queen Victoria's half-sister. The wedding took place on 20 April 1896 in Coburg, Germany. Alexandra was 17 and Ernst 32.

They had five children:
 Prince Gottfried, 8th Prince of Hohenlohe-Langenburg (24 March 1897 – 11 May 1960); married Princess Margarita of Greece and Denmark, the eldest sister of the future Prince Philip, Duke of Edinburgh, and had issue.
 Princess Marie Melita of Hohenlohe-Langenburg (18 January 1899 – 8 November 1967); married Wilhelm Friedrich, Duke of Schleswig-Holstein and had issue.
 Princess Alexandra Beatrice Leopoldine of Hohenlohe-Langenburg (2 April 1901 – 26 October 1963)
 Princess Irma Helene of Hohenlohe-Langenburg (4 July 1902 – 8 March 1986)
 Prince Alfred Christian of Hohenlohe-Langenburg  (16 April 1911 – 18 April 1911)

Later life
Alexandra lived for the rest of her life in Germany. At the death of her father in 1900, Alexandra's husband was appointed regent of the duchy of Saxe-Coburg during the minority of the new Duke, who was her first cousin. Alexandra's only brother, Alfred, had died in 1899. During World War I, she worked as a Red Cross nurse. In February 1916 her eldest daughter Marie Melita was married in Coburg to Prince Wilhelm Friedrich, the future Duke of Schleswig-Holstein, and Alexandra became a grandmother when the couple's first child Prince Hans was born in May 1917. On her thirty-fifth wedding anniversary in April 1931, her eldest son Gottfried married Princess Margarita of Greece and Denmark, elder sister of Prince Philip, Duke of Edinburgh and future sister in law to future Queen Queen Elizabeth II. In the years preceding World War II, Alexandra was an early supporter of the Nazi Party, which she joined on 1 May 1937, together with several of her children. She died in Schwäbisch Hall, Baden-Württemberg, Germany in 1942.

Archives
Princess Alexandra's personal papers (including family correspondence and photographs) are preserved in the Hohenlohe-Langenburg family archive (Nachlass Fürstin Alexandra, HZAN La 143), which is in the Hohenlohe Central Archive (Hohenlohe-Zentralarchiv Neuenstein) in Neuenstein Castle in the town of Neuenstein, Baden-Württemberg, Germany, and it is open for researchers.

Arms

Alexandra's personal coat of arms was that of the British monarch, with an inescutcheon of the shield of Saxony, all differenced, as a male-line grandchild, with a label argent of five points, the central point bearing a cross gules, the inner pair anchors azure, and the outer pair fleurs-de-lys azure. In 1917, the inescutcheon was dropped by Royal Warrant from George V.

Ancestry

Notes

Bibliography
 Petropoulos, Jonathan, Royals and the Reich, Oxford University Press, New York, 2006, 
 Zeepvat, Charlotte, "The other one: Alexandra of Hohenlohe- langeburg", in Royalty History Digest.

1878 births
1942 deaths
British princesses
British people of Russian descent
Companions of the Order of the Crown of India
German people of Russian descent
House of Hohenlohe-Langenburg
House of Saxe-Coburg and Gotha (United Kingdom)
Ladies of the Royal Order of Victoria and Albert
People from Coburg
Princesses of Hohenlohe-Langenburg
Princesses of Saxe-Coburg and Gotha
Royalty in the Nazi Party
Daughters of monarchs